Pascal Khoo Thwe (born 1967) is a Burmese author from the minority Padaung people, known for his autobiographic writings about growing up in Burma under military rule.    His book, From the Land of Green Ghosts: A Burmese Odyssey, was awarded the Kiriyama Prize.

Biography
Thwe was born in Pekon (Phekhon, Pekong, Pecong, Pékon), Shan State, Burma (Myanmar). He is the eldest of six sons and five daughters. His father died in 1996 in Thailand.

By a chance encounter with Dr. John Casey, a Cambridge don, Khoo Thwe was rescued from the jungles of Burma where he and other student refugees were fighting Burmese soldiers for independence. In 1991 Khoo Thwe enrolled in Gonville and Caius College, Cambridge where he received his BA in English literature in 1995. Khoo Thwe's autobiographical book "From the Land of Green Ghosts" was published by Harper-Collins in 2002. He currently resides in London.

References

External links
 Pascal Khoo Thwe, From the Land of Green Ghosts: A Burmese Odyssey (2002),  
BBC Radio 4: Taking a Stand - BBC journalist Fergal Keane interviews Pascal Khoo Thwe about his life for a radio programme first broadcast on BBC Radio 4 on 18 December 2007.

Burmese writers
1967 births
Living people
Alumni of Gonville and Caius College, Cambridge
Burmese people of Karen descent
People from Shan State
Burmese expatriates in the United Kingdom